The women's 78 kg competition of the 2011 World Judo Championships was held on August 26. it was won by the French athlete Audrey Tcheuméo.

Medalists

Results

Pool A

Pool B

Pool C

Pool D

Repechage

Finals

References

External links
 
 Draw

W78
World Judo Championships Women's Half Heavyweight
World W78